The 1986 Soviet First League was the 47th season of the second tier of association football in the Soviet Union.

Teams
Demoted from the Soviet Top League: FC Fakel Voronezh and FC SKA Rostov/Donu.
Promoted from the Soviet Second League: FC Rostselmash Rostov/Donu, FC Iskra Smolensk, and FC Atalantas Klaipėda.

League standings
Note: 12 draws limit was applied during the season.

Match for 1st place

Top scorers

Number of teams by union republic

See also
 Soviet First League

External links
 1986 First League. football.lg.ua (Luhansk Our Football)

Soviet First League seasons
2
Soviet
Soviet